Royse City Independent School District is a public school district based in Royse City, Texas (USA). The district lies in eastern Rockwall County, and extends into parts of Collin and Hunt counties.

The district's superintendent is Kevin Worthy, formerly of Gunter, Texas, who was chosen on March 27, 2012 and started work on May 7, 2012.
He replaced former superintendent Randy Hancock, who retired in June 2012.

In 2009, the school district was rated "academically acceptable" by the Texas Education Agency.

Schools

Secondary schools

High schools 
 Royse City High School (Royse City)
 H.H. Browning Alternative Learning Center (Royse City)

Middle schools 
 Ouida Baley Middle School (Royse City)
 Bobby Summers Middle School (Fate)

Primary schools

Elementary schools 
 Ruth Cherry Elementary School (Royse City)
 Harry H. Herndon Elementary School (Fate)
 Anita Scott Elementary School (Royse City)
 Davis Elementary School (Royse City)
 Miss May Vernon Elementary School (Fate)
 W.R. (Bill) Fort Elementary School (Royse City)

See also

List of school districts in Texas

References

External links
 

School districts in Rockwall County, Texas
School districts in Collin County, Texas
School districts in Hunt County, Texas